Medghal District is a district of the Marib Governorate, Yemen. As of 2003, the district had a population of 10,654 inhabitants.

References

Districts of Marib Governorate